Gareth Daniel Noake Thomas (12 February 1945 – 13 April 2016) was a Welsh actor, born in England. He rose to national prominence playing the role of Roj Blake in the BBC science fiction television series Blake's 7 (1978–1981).

Early life
Thomas was born on 12 February 1945 in Brentford, England, and grew up in Aberystwyth, Wales. He was the younger of two sons of Kenneth Thomas, a barrister who had been a junior at the Nuremberg trials, and his wife, Olga (née Noake). Thomas attended the King's School, Canterbury. He then trained at RADA and later became an Associate Member. He was a member of the National Youth Theatre, appearing with them in the 1967 production of Zigger Zagger.

Career
Thomas made many television appearances, including The Avengers, Coronation Street, Z-Cars, Special Branch, Sutherland's Law, Public Eye, Who Pays the Ferryman?, Bergerac, By the Sword Divided, The Citadel, Knights of God, Boon, London's Burning, Casualty, Taggart, Heartbeat, Sherlock Holmes, How Green Was My Valley, Torchwood and Midsomer Murders.

He appeared on stage in many productions. His appearances include RSC productions of Twelfth Night, Othello and Anna Christie; English Shakespeare Company productions of Henry IV, Part 1 and Part 2 and Henry V; and King Lear, Educating Rita, Cat on a Hot Tin Roof, The Crucible, Equus and Déjà Vu. In 2000, Thomas was the first subject of MJTV's interview/drama CD series The Actor Speaks. In one of the interviews he spoke about his character Roj Blake, leader of the crew of the Liberator in Blake's 7. From 1999 to 2005, he took part in 12 out of 14 CD episodes of MJTV's original audio comedy sci-fi drama series Soldiers of Love, in which he played camp Welsh TV host Hywel Hammond and villain of the piece Aaron Arkenstein. In 2010, Thomas gave an acclaimed performance as Ephraim Cabot in Desire Under the Elms at the New Vic Theatre.

In 2001 he appeared in Storm Warning, an audio drama by Big Finish Productions, based on Doctor Who. He also played the part of Kalendorf in the Big Finish Productions Dalek Empire series. In 2006 he appeared as a guest star in the Doctor Who spin-off series Torchwood, in the episode "Ghost Machine". Thomas returned to the role of Roj Blake in 2012, in Big Finish Productions' Blake's 7: The Liberator Chronicles, a series of dramatic readings which take place during Series One before the death of Olag Gan. Thomas starred as Blake in Counterfeit by Peter Anghelides and False Positive by Eddie Robson. In 2013 he appeared as Brother Cadfael in Middle Ground Theatre Company's adaption of The Virgin in the Ice by Ellis Peters. He was twice nominated for a BAFTA, for his performances in Stocker's Copper (BBC Play for Today, 1972) and Morgan's Boy (1984).

Morgan's Boy was his favourite television role, but Blake's 7 won bigger audiences.

Personal life
Thomas had two children with his first wife, Annie; this marriage ended in divorce. His second wife, Sheelagh Wells, was a make-up artist who had worked on Blakes 7; this marriage also ended in divorce. His third wife was Linda. After many years living in the Scottish Borders, he moved to Surrey in 2009.

Death
Thomas died in Surrey on 13 April 2016 of heart failure, aged 71. His Blake's 7 co-star Stephen Greif paid tribute, saying he was "very sad to hear of the death of my good friend Gareth Thomas. We were at RADA then Blake's 7 and onwards. He was a proud Welshman."

Filmography

Film

Television

References

Sources

External links 

 
 Hermit.org: Biography and role listing
 Obituary – BBC

1945 births
2016 deaths
Alumni of RADA
People educated at The King's School, Canterbury
People from Aberystwyth
Royal Shakespeare Company members
Welsh male film actors
Welsh male Shakespearean actors
Welsh male soap opera actors
Welsh male stage actors
Welsh male television actors